This is a list of Australian Statutory Instruments from 1904.

1904 Commonwealth Of Australia Numbered Acts 
 Acts Interpretation Act 1904 (no. 1, 1904)
 Supplementary Appropriation Act 1903-4 (no. 2, 1904)
 Supplementary Appropriation (works And Buildings) Act 1903-4 (no. 3, 1904)
 Supply Act (no 1) 1904-5 (no. 4, 1904)
 Supply Act (no 2) 1904-5 (no. 5, 1904)
 Further Supplementary Appropriation Act 1902-3 (no. 6, 1904)
 Seat of Government Act 1904 (no. 7, 1904)
 Supply Act (no 3) 1904-5 (no. 8, 1904)
 Supply Act (no 4) 1904-5 (no. 9, 1904)
 Supply Act (no 5) 1904-5 (no. 10, 1904)
 Appropriation (works And Buildings) Act 1904-5 (no. 11, 1904)
 Defence Act 1904 (no. 12, 1904)
 Commonwealth Conciliation And Arbitration Act 1904 (no. 13, 1904)
 Sea-carriage Of Goods Act 1904 (no. 14, 1904)
 Appropriation Act 1904-5 (no. 15, 1904)

See also  
 List of Acts of the Parliament of Australia
 List of Statutory Instruments of Australia

External links 
 1904 Commonwealth of Australia Numbered Act http://www.austlii.edu.au/au/legis/cth/num_act/1904/
 COMLAW Historical Acts http://www.comlaw.gov.au/Browse/ByTitle/Acts/Historical
 COMLAW Select Statutory Instruments http://www.comlaw.gov.au/Browse/ByYearNumber/SelectLIsandStatRules/Asmade/0/

Lists of the Statutory Instruments of Australia
Statutory Instruments